"Every Day I Have to Cry", also known as  "Every Day I Have to Cry Some", is a song written by Arthur Alexander and first recorded by Steve Alaimo in 1962.  Although the song has been recorded by many musicians over the years, Alexander did not record his own version until 1975.  His version went to #46 on the US Billboard Hot 100 chart (and #45 Cash Box).  None of the other versions made it into the Top 40 on the US chart.  It became Alaimo's greatest hit, his second of nine charting singles.

Bee Gees version
The Bee Gees covered "Every Day I Have to Cry" as teenage recording artists in Australia. This version was recorded at Festival Studios in February 1965 and marked an important first for the group, Maurice Gibb playing organ, which was the first of many times he would contribute keyboards to the group's recordings. The record was backed with "You Wouldn't Know", a Barry Gibb original which was also featured later the same year on the group's first album, The Bee Gees Sing and Play 14 Barry Gibb Songs.

Both songs were included on the 1998 anthology of the group's Australian recordings Brilliant from Birth.

Other versions

References

External links
 

Songs written by Arthur Alexander
1962 songs
1962 singles
Bee Gees songs
The Gentrys songs
Arthur Alexander songs
Checker Records singles
Leedon Records singles
Joe Stampley songs